School District of Indian River County (SDIRC), also known as Indian River County School District, is a public school district that covers Indian River County, Florida. The district headquarters are in Vero Beach.

Superintendent
The current superintendent of the Indian River county school district is David K. Moore, Ed.D. Before joining the district, he was an assistant superintendent of Miami-Dade County Public Schools.

School board

The district school board is elected on a non-partisan basis.

District 1:  Mara Schiff 
District 2:  Jacqueline Rosario 
District 3:  Peggy Jones - vice chairman
District 4:  Teri L. Barenborg - chairman
District 5:  Brian M. Barefoot

Schools

The district operates the following public schools:

High schools
Sebastian River High School 

 Sebastian, Florida
 Principal: Christopher A. Cummings 
 Mascot: Sharks

Vero Beach High School 

 Vero Beach, Florida
 Principal: Shawn O'Keefe 
 Mascot: Fighting Indians
 Includes a freshman learning center.

Middle schools

Gifford Middle School
 Vero Beach, Florida
 Principal: Tosha Harris
 Mascot: Dolphins

Oslo Middle School
 Vero Beach, Florida
 Principal: Eddie Robinson
 Mascot: Wildcats

Sebastian River Middle School
 Sebastian, Florida
 Principal: Todd Racine
 Mascot: Cowboys

Storm Grove Middle School
 Vero Beach, Florida
 Principal: Anne Bieber 
 Mascot: Stingrays

Magnet elementary schools
Liberty Magnet School
 Vero Beach, Florida
 Principal: Takeisha Harris 

Osceola Magnet School
 Vero Beach, Florida
 Principal: Elizabeth Tetreault
 Mascot: Explorers

Rosewood Magnet School
 Vero Beach, Florida
 Principal: Casandra Flores

Elementary schools
Beachland Elementary School
 Vero Beach, Florida
 Principal: Rachel Finnegan 
 Mascot: Sharks
 A STEAM school of excellence.

Citrus Elementary School
 Vero Beach, Florida
 Principal: Kimberly Garcia 
 Mascot: Bees

Dodgertown Elementary School

 Vero Beach, Florida
 Principal: Aretha Vernette 
 Mascot: Dodgers

Fellsmere Elementary School
 Fellsmere, Florida
 Principal: Ramon Echeverria 
 Mascot: Mustangs

Glendale Elementary School
 Vero Beach, Florida
 Principal: Adam Faust 
 Mascot: Gators

Indian River Academy
 Vero Beach, Florida
 Principal: Christine Good
 Mascot: Black Bears

Pelican Island Elementary School
 Sebastian, Florida
 Principal: Rachel Moree 
 Mascot: Pelicans

Sebastian Elementary School
 Sebastian, Florida
 Principal: Letitcia Whitfield-Hart
 Mascot: Sea Turtles

Treasure Coast Elementary School
 Sebastian, Florida
 Principal: Scott Simpson
 Mascot: Pirates

Vero Beach Elementary School
 Vero Beach, Florida
 Principal: Lyndsey Matheny
 Mascot: Indians

Charter schools

 Imagine Schools at South Vero
 Indian River Charter High School
 North County Charter Elementary School
 Sebastian Charter Junior High School

Alternative schools

Alternative Center for Education
Wabasso School

Other programs

The district operates adult and community education programs.
The district operates the Vero Beach High School environmental technology program.

References

External links

 

 
Indian River
Education in Indian River County, Florida